John Brandon (fl. 1687), was an English divine.

Life
Brandon was the son of Charles Brandon, a doctor of Maidenhead, was apparently born at Bray, near that town, about 1644.

He entered Oriel College, Oxford, as a commoner on 15 Feb. 1661-2, and proceeded B.A. on 11 November 1665. Anthony Wood says that "he entertained for some time certain heterodox opinions, but afterwards being orthodox", took holy orders. He became rector of Finchampstead, and for some years preached a weekly lecture on Tuesdays at Reading.

Writings
Το πύρ το αίώνιον, or Everlasting Fire no Fancy; being an answer to a late pamphlet entit. "The Foundations of Hell-Torments shaken and removed (1678). The book was dedicated to Henry, earl of Starlin, from "Wargrave [in Berkshire], 20 July 1676". It was written in reply to a pamphlet called The Torments of Hell (1658), by  Samuel Richardson. 
Happiness at Hand, or a plain and practical discourse of the Joy of just men's souls in the State of Separation from the Body (1687).  Dedicated to Dr. Robert Woodward, chancellor of the bishop of Salisbury's court.
Selected sermons for publication.

References

Year of death missing
English theologians
17th-century English writers
17th-century English male writers
People from Maidenhead
People from Bray, Berkshire
People from Finchampstead
Year of birth unknown
English male non-fiction writers